Caldo verde (Portuguese for "green broth") is a popular soup in Portuguese cuisine.

The basic traditional ingredients for caldo verde are finely shredded Portuguese cabbage or couve-galega (essentially a type of collard green), (or alternatively other leafy greens such as kale or mustard greens), potatoes, olive oil, black pepper and salt, mainly flavoured with onion and garlic (some regional recipes favour slight variations, like turnip greens or added meat, such as ham hock, making it similar to Italo-American wedding soup). Traditionally the soup is accompanied by slices of paio, chouriço or linguiça (boiled whole with the potatoes, then sliced and added to the finished soup when serving) and with Portuguese broa corn-bread or rye-bread for dipping. In Portugal, the popular soup caldo verde is typically consumed during Portuguese celebrations, such as weddings, birthdays and popular celebrations. It is sometimes consumed before a main course meal or as a late supper. This soup is served in a tigela, a traditional earthenware bowl.

History
Caldo verde originated from the Minho Province in northern Portugal. Today, it is a traditional national favourite that has spread across the nation and abroad, especially to places where a large community of Portuguese migrants have settled such as Brazil, Macau, Massachusetts, New Jersey, Rhode Island, and Toronto. References to the soup appear in many novels by Camilo Castelo Branco.

See also

 Caldo gallego
 List of soups
 Stamppot
 Colcannon

References

Portuguese soups
Brazilian soups
Vegetable dishes
Macanese cuisine
Brassica oleracea dishes
Potato dishes